Flemings may refer to:

Flemish people, the majority population in Flanders
Flemings (supermarkets), a chain of Australian supermarkets
Robert Fleming & Co., a merchant bank founded in 1873 and sold to Chase Manhattan Bank
Fleming's Prime Steakhouse & Wine Bar, a chain of US fine dining steakhouses

See also
Fleming (disambiguation)
Flemming